The Latin Grammy Award for Best Tango Album has been presented every year since the 1st Latin Grammy Awards ceremony. The description of the category at the 2020 Latin Grammy Awards states that it is "for vocal or instrumental albums that contain at least 51% of total play time recorded with new material or material by traditional authors. Fusions with other musical genres will be eligible, provided that the Tango genre is substantially maintained in the judgement of the Ad Hoc committee."

Spanish singer Diego el Cigala is the only artist to receive the award more than once with two wins, in 2011 and 2013. Argentine musicians Rodolfo Mederos and Leopoldo Federico hold the record of most nominations in the category with six each.

Winners and nominees

2000s

2010s

2020s

See also

 Tango music

References

External links 
Official website of the Latin Grammy Awards

Latin Grammy Awards for traditional music
Tango Album
Tango